CUNY TV  is a non-commercial educational television station in New York City, part of the City University of New York's university system. It provides tele-course programming varying in subjects from mathematics, physics, and biology to history, art, and social studies. It also provides cultural programming with shows in German, Spanish, and French. The station was first established in 1985, and in 2009 became a full-capacity HD studio and post-production facility, with a six-camera mobile production truck.

History 
The station was first established in 1985 as CUNY TV.

In 2009, the station transitioned to HDTV and began broadcasting on cable in SD and on WNYE-TV digital channel DTV 25.3 in 720p HD.

In 2012 television and radio studios at CUNY TV were renamed as The Himan Brown TV & Radio Studios, after Himan Brown, an American radio producer and director. Since 1999, the station has won numerous television industry awards, including 18 New York Emmy Awards, numerous Telly Awards, and Communicator Awards for its variety of series and program specials.

Original programming 

The station airs Amy Goodman's Democracy Now! twice a day, as well as daily world news in English from Deutsche Welle. The station also airs many classic and foreign films, especially from Poland, like Prof. Jerry Carlson's and City College's film studies program's show, City Cinematheque. Public affairs shows also include the Baruch College's forums. The station also produces and co-produces a number of original series at its studios in New York City. After original airing on cable, the shows are archived and uploaded to the station's YouTube channel. 

Some original series currently in production are:
 219West, CUNY Graduate School of Journalism's monthly news magazine that covers the New York City area;
 Arts in the City, a monthly look at the lively arts scene in the New York metropolitan area, hosted by Carol Anne Riddell;
 Asian American Life, monthly series about the fastest growing immigrant group in the country, living in the New York metropolitan area, hosted by Ernabel Demillo;
 Black America, in-depth conversation that explores what it means to be Black in America;
 Bob Herbert's Op-Ed.TV;
 Building New York: New York Stories and The Stoler Report - New York's Business Report series about real estate and business leaders of the Metropolitan region;
 City Cinematheque, world film series, hosted by Professor Jerry Carlson, includes a lively discussion with scholars, film professionals, and critics;
 CityWide, monthly talk show covers business and public affairs in New York City (Archive);
 Conversations with Jim Zirin, interview show about understanding and interpreting national and world events;
 CUNY Forum, an hour-long monthly forum to discuss in New York City government and politics;
 DiverseCITY, monthly magazine show about New York City's neighbourhoods and ethnic communities;
 Eldridge & Co., hosted by former New York City Council member Ronnie Eldridge;
 Italics: The Italian American Magazine, hosted by Anthony Julian Tamburri;
 LATiNAS, half hour magazine show about Latina women nationwide, hosted by Tinabeth Piña;
 The Laura Flanders Show, weekly series reporting on the social critics, artists, activists & entrepreneurs building tomorrow's world today, hosted by journalist Laura Flanders;
 The New York Times Close Up with Sam Roberts, a weekly show discussing the big stories with journalists covering them and with leading newsmakers;
 Nueva York, multiple New York Emmy award-winning series  explores Latino culture in New York City;
 One to One, public affairs interviews by journalist Sheryl McCarthy;
 The Open Mind, weekly nationally syndicated conversation series hosted by Alexander Heffner (initially hosted by its creator Richard D. Heffner from 1956-2013);
 Pat Collins’ Spotlight on Broadway, a monthly program focusing on Broadway’s new productions as well as established hit shows;
 Science & U!, explores the world of science, for audiences of all ages;
 Science Goes to the Movies, series that looks at the science in contemporary motion pictures;
 Study With The Best, magazine-style show profiling success stories from The City University of New York, hosted by Tinabeth Piña;
 THEATER: All the Moving Parts, monthly show profiling theatre creators hosted by Patrick Pacheco;
 Tony Guida's NY, a talk show hosted by New York City journalist Tony Guida;
 Urban U, formerly "Study With The Best" a New York Emmy award-winning monthly magazine show about CUNY institution, its students, faculty, and alumni;

Past CUNY TV series include:
 African-American Legends, profiled prominent African-Americans, hosted by Roscoe C. Brown, Jr;
 Art or Something Like It;
 Black Writers in America, nationally syndicated;
 Brian Lehrer TV;
 Brian Talks New York, was a weekly show hosted by the WNYC radio host Brian Lehrer;
 Canapé, series devoted to French cultural events in New York City and the United States;
 City Talk;
 Day at Night;
 Independent Sources, series about New York's ethnic and immigrant communities;
 Jewish Women In America;
 MetroView;
 Moyers & Company;
 POTUS 2016 with Brian Lehrer;
 TimesTalks, was a long-running talk show co-produced with The New York Times;
 The American Theatre Wing's Working in the Theatre;
 The Urban Agenda;
 Theater Talk, was a New York Emmy award-winning nationally syndicated talk show about theatre;
 Women in Theatre;
 Women to Women;

(Most past series are archived on the station's website)

References

External links
 

City University of New York
Educational and instructional television channels
Television stations in New York City